The 2020 Copa Colombia, officially the 2020 Copa BetPlay Dimayor for sponsorship reasons, was the 18th edition of the Copa Colombia, the national cup competition for clubs of DIMAYOR. The tournament was contested by 36 teams and began on 19 February 2020. It concluded on 11 February 2021, with the champions qualifying for the 2022 Copa Sudamericana. Independiente Medellín were the defending champions and successfully defended their title by beating Deportes Tolima 5–4 on penalties in the final after tying 1–1 over 90 minutes.

On 13 March 2020, after a meeting with its member clubs, DIMAYOR announced the temporary suspension of the tournament, along with the Primera A and Primera B ones, due to the COVID-19 pandemic. The competition was suspended until 23 September 2020.

Format
The format for the 2020 Copa Colombia was the same one used for the 2018 edition, with the competition being played in a single-elimination format in its entirety, without any group stages. The 16 Categoría Primera B teams entered the competition in the first stage, being drawn into eight ties. After two stages, four Primera B teams qualified for the third stage, along with the twelve Categoría Primera A teams that did not enter international competition in the 2020 season, which entered the cup at that stage. Finally, in the round of 16, the eight third stage winners were joined by the four Copa Libertadores qualifiers (Junior, América de Cali, Deportes Tolima, and Independiente Medellín), as well as the four Copa Sudamericana qualifiers (Deportivo Cali, Atlético Nacional, Millonarios, and Deportivo Pasto), which entered the competition at this point.

Due to the suspension of the competition caused by the COVID-19 pandemic, on 9 September 2020 DIMAYOR announced that, starting from the round of 16, all subsequent stages up to the final would be played as single-legged ties instead of double-legged ones as originally planned. Furthermore, it was confirmed that the champions would qualify for the 2022 Copa Sudamericana, instead of the 2021 Copa Libertadores as originally planned.

Schedule 
The schedule of the competition was as follows, with most rounds rescheduled due to the COVID-19 pandemic:

First stage
The first stage was played by the 16 Categoría Primera B clubs, eight of which were seeded in the ties according to their placement in the 2019 season aggregate table. The two relegated clubs from the Categoría Primera A (Unión Magdalena and Atlético Huila) along with the remaining Primera B clubs were drawn into each tie. The seeded clubs (Team 2) hosted the second leg.

|}

First leg

Second leg

Second stage
The second stage was played by the eight first stage winners. In each tie, the clubs with the best performance in the first stage hosted the second leg.

|}

First leg

Second leg

Third stage
The third stage was played by the four second stage winners and the 12 Categoría Primera A clubs that did not qualify for international competition, which were seeded in the ties according to their placement in the 2019 season aggregate table. The two promoted clubs from the Categoría Primera B (Deportivo Pereira and Boyacá Chicó) were the last two seeded teams, with Deportivo Pereira taking the eleventh position and Boyacá Chicó the twelfth position. The four second stage winners as well as the best four teams according to the 2019 Primera A aggregate table hosted the second leg.

|}

First leg

Second leg

Final stages
Each tie in the final stages was played in a single-legged format. In each tie, the team with the better overall record up to that stage hosted the match, except in the round of 16 where the third stage winners hosted it. The teams entering the competition at this stage were the ones that qualified for the 2020 Copa Libertadores and 2020 Copa Sudamericana, which were drawn into each of the eight ties. In case of a tie, extra time was not applied and the winner was decided in a penalty shoot-out.

Bracket

Round of 16
The third stage winners hosted the match.

Quarter-finals

Semi-finals

Final
For the final, the Ministry of Health of Colombia and the Municipality of Medellín authorized the entry of 30 people to watch the game, all of them belonging to Independiente Medellín's organized fan group.

Notes

References

See also
 2020 Categoría Primera A season
 2020 Categoría Primera B season

External links 
  

Copa Colombia seasons
2020 in Colombian football
Colombia
2021 in Colombian football